Southern West Virginia King's Warriors was an American soccer club based in Forest Hill, West Virginia. The King's Warriors played in the South Atlantic Division of the Premier Development League.

About
The club is "a Christian sports ministry of The Nehemiah Group, Inc." and is affiliated with Countryside Baptist Church in Forest Hill, West Virginia.

Stadium
King's Warriors home matches were played at the East River Soccer Complex in Bluefield. They also played at the YMCA Paul Cline Memorial Youth Sports Complex in Beckley for the 2012 and 2013 seasons.

Year-by-year

Head coaches
  Scott Reitnour (2012–2014)
  John Miglarese (2014–2016)

References

External links
 Club website

Association football clubs established in 2012
Association football clubs disestablished in 2017
USL League Two teams
Defunct soccer clubs in West Virginia
2012 establishments in West Virginia
2017 disestablishments in West Virginia